Suipinima marginalis is a species of beetle in the family Cerambycidae. It was described by Martins and Galileo in 2004.

References

Aerenicini
Beetles described in 2004